Tiphaine is a francophone first name and last name.

 Tiphaine (given name)
 Tiphaine (surname)